Metochi may refer to:
Metochion, an ecclesiastical embassy church in Eastern Orthodoxy
places in Greece:
Metochi, Larissos, a settlement in the municipal unit of Larissos, Achaea
Metochi, Kalavryta, a settlement in the municipality of Kalavryta, Achaea
Metochi Dirfyon, a village in the municipal unit of Kymi, Euboea
Metochi Kireos, a village in the municipal unit of Kireas, Euboea
Kato Metochi, a village in the municipality of Oropedio Lasithiou, Lasithi
the Greek name for Metoq, a village in the Sarandë District, southern Albania